Amsinckia spectabilis is a species of fiddleneck known by the common names seaside fiddleneck and woolly breeches. It is native to the west coast of North America from British Columbia to Baja California, where it grows in sandy habitat, including direct coastline.

Description
Amsinckia spectabilis is a bristly annual herb similar in appearance to other fiddlenecks. The leaves are sometimes edged with fine teeth.

References

External links
 Calflora Database: Amsinckia spectabilis (Seaside fiddleneck, Woolly breeches)
Jepson Manual eFlora (TJM2) treatment of Amsinckia spectabilis
UC CalPhotos gallery of Amsinckia spectabilis

spectabilis
Flora of Baja California
Flora of British Columbia
Flora of California
Flora of Oregon
Flora of Washington (state)
Natural history of the California chaparral and woodlands
Natural history of the Channel Islands of California
Plants described in 1836
Flora without expected TNC conservation status